Ferdows Hot Spring or Ferdows Warm Spring ( – Abgarm-e-Ma'dani-e-Ferdows) is a hot mineral spring located about  north of Ferdows in eastern Iran, near an inactive volcano. Its mineral water is useful in healing skin diseases and rheumatism.

It has several individual bathtubs and some public pools for visitors. For tourists, there is a motel and other residence options near the spring. Ferdows Hot Spring is one of the main attractions of the South Khorasan province, Iran.

External links 
Official Website

Hot springs of Iran
Tourist attractions in Ferdows County
Tourist attractions in South Khorasan Province
Landforms of South Khorasan Province